David Sibusiso Nyathi (born 22 March 1969) is a retired South African soccer player, who is currently the assistant coach at Ajax Cape Town, and previously coached their under-19 team.

Career 
Nyathi started playing professional football for Dangerous Darkies who were promoted to the NSL in the 1991 season. They were relegated into obscurity after one season in the top flight and "Going Up", as he was affectionately known, joined Orlando Pirates. He became part of the first Bafana Bafana squad upon the country's return to international football in 1992. He moved on to Cape Town Spurs where he won the league and cup double in 1995. He later moved to Europe where he played for a few teams, including FC St. Gallen (Switzerland), Ankaragücü (Turkey), CD Tenerife (Spain) and Cagliari Calcio (Italy).

International 
He played for South Africa national soccer team and was in part of the squad that travelled to France for the 1998 FIFA World Cup. He was also part of the squad that won the 1996 African Cup of Nations.

References

External links 
 
 Nyathi's Profile
 

1969 births
Living people
People from Bushbuckridge
South African soccer players
South Africa international soccer players
South African expatriate soccer players
La Liga players
Dangerous Darkies players
Orlando Pirates F.C. players
Cape Town Spurs F.C. players
Kaizer Chiefs F.C. players
CD Tenerife players
FC St. Gallen players
Cagliari Calcio players
MKE Ankaragücü footballers
Serie A players
Süper Lig players
Expatriate footballers in Italy
Expatriate footballers in Spain
Expatriate footballers in Switzerland
Expatriate footballers in Turkey
1996 African Cup of Nations players
South African expatriate sportspeople in Turkey
1998 African Cup of Nations players
1997 FIFA Confederations Cup players
1998 FIFA World Cup players
South African expatriate sportspeople in Switzerland
South African expatriate sportspeople in Spain
Association football defenders